Henry Regis Granjon (June 15, 1863 – November 9, 1922) was a French-born prelate of the Roman Catholic Church. He served as bishop of the Diocese of Tucson in the American Southwest from 1900 until his death in 1922.

Biography

Early life 
Henry Granjon was born in Saint-Étienne, Loire, to Pierre Marie and Jeanne (née Meunier) Granjon. He received his seminary training at Saint-Sulpice in Paris, and in Rome, where he earned a Doctor of Divinity degree. 

Granjon was ordained to the priesthood on December 17, 1887. He joined the missions at Arizona in 1890. After arriving in Arizona, he was sent to a mission in Tombstone. From 1897 to 1900, he was in charge of the Society for the Propagation of the Faith, with residence in Baltimore, Maryland.

Bishop of Tucson 
On April 19, 1900, Granjon was appointed the second bishop of the Diocese of Tucson by Pope Leo XIII. He received his episcopal consecration at the Baltimore Cathedral on the following June 17 from Cardinal James Gibbons, with Bishops John J. Monaghan and Edward Patrick Allen serving as co-consecrators. 

During his tenure, the Mission San Xavier del Bac on the San Xavier Indian Reservation underwent needed restoration. Granjon contributed the articles "Tucson" and "Mission San Xavier del Bac" to the Catholic Encyclopedia.In 1904, Granjon stated that his diocese included "...40,000 Catholics, 90,000 heretics and 30,000 infidels". 

At age 59, Henry Granjon died on November 9, 1922, in Brignais, France while on a trip in Europe to meet with Pope Pius XI.

References

1863 births
1922 deaths
People from Saint-Étienne
French emigrants to the United States
Seminary of Saint-Sulpice (France) alumni
French Roman Catholic missionaries
French Roman Catholic bishops in North America
Roman Catholic bishops of Tucson
Roman Catholic missionaries in the United States
Contributors to the Catholic Encyclopedia